The men's 400 metres event at the 2014 African Championships in Athletics was held August 10–12 on Stade de Marrakech.

Medalists

Results

Heats
Qualification: First 3 of each heat (Q) and the next 4 fastest (q) qualified for the semifinals.

Semifinals
Qualification: First 3 of each semifinal (Q) and the next 2 fastest (q) qualified for the final.

Final

References

2014 African Championships in Athletics
400 metres at the African Championships in Athletics